Virgo (Arabic: برج العذراء, translit. Borj Al-Athraa, aliases: The Planet of the Virgo) is a 1970 Egyptian film directed by Mahmoud Zulfikar. The film stars Salah Zulfikar, Nahed Sherif and Adel Emam.

Synopsis 
Fahmy is an ardent believer in Astrology and horoscopes and manages his life according to them. And a number of events increase his conviction, such as his promotion at work, which the horoscope predicts, the death of his uncle, and then his inheritance from him. An astrologer convinces him that his age is linked to a Virgo girl who has a black birthmark, which he is looking for. He discovers that she is Nana the fiancée of his friend Amin, so he tries to save her life. Nana and Ilham his wife agree on a plan to convince Fahmy of the mistake of relying on astrology.

Crew 
 Director: Mahmoud Zulfikar
 Screenplay: Farouk Saeed
 Production studio: El Shoala Films (Mohamed Younes)
 Distributor: General Egyptian Organization for Cinema Production
 Cinematographer: Ali Khair Allah
 Editor: Fekry Rostom

Cast 
 Salah Zulfikar as (Fahmy)
 Nahed Sherif as (Nana)
 Adel Emam as (Amin)
 Lebleba as (Ilham)
 Hussein Ismail as (GM of sub-contractor)
 Mokhtar Amin as (Hussain)
 Kawthar Shafik as (Hanaa)
 Sanaa Younes as (Ehsan)
 Hussein El Touni as (Ismail)
 Fifi Youssef as (Hussein's wife)
 Khadiga Mahmoud as (cigarette seller)
 Abdel Ghani Al-Nagdy as (Dajil Falafel)
 El Sayed Rady as (Khalil Diab - Psychiatrist)
 Abdel Moneim Abdel Rahman as (Ali)
 Amira as herself
 Farouk Falawkas as (lawyer)
 Saleh El-Iskandarani as (Officer of Sub Contractor)
 Mohammed Sultan as (Kamal)
 Emad Muharram as (invitee at the home evening party)

See also 

 Salah Zulfikar filmography
 List of Egyptian films of 1970
 List of Egyptian films of the 1970s

References

External links 

 
 Virgo on elCinema

1970 films
1970s Arabic-language films
20th-century Egyptian films
Egyptian black-and-white films
Films shot in Egypt
Films directed by Mahmoud Zulfikar
Films about astrology